Seabrook Greyhound Park was a greyhound racing track in Seabrook, New Hampshire, United States. Opened on July 2, 1973, the facility ended live racing in 2009, while continuing to offer simulcast wagering of races at other locations.

In 2019, the facility was purchased by Nevada-based Eureka Casino Resort. The property, renamed as The Brook, underwent a yearlong, multi-million dollar renovation and features a casino operating under the charitable gaming laws of the state, poker room, racebook and DraftKings sportsbook. It is the only facility in New Hampshire that offers off-track betting.

See also
 Hinsdale Greyhound Park

References

External links
 

Sports venues completed in 1973
2009 disestablishments
Buildings and structures in Rockingham County, New Hampshire
Defunct greyhound racing venues in the United States
Defunct sports venues in New Hampshire
1973 establishments in New Hampshire
2009 disestablishments in New Hampshire
Seabrook, New Hampshire